The 2022–23 Northwestern State Lady Demons basketball team represents Northwestern State University during the 2022–23 NCAA Division I women's basketball season. The Demons, led by third year head coach Anna Nimz play their home games at Prather Coliseum located in Natchitoches, Louisiana and are members of the Southland Conference.

Previous season
The Lady Demons finished the 2021–22 season with a 12–14 record overall and a 5–9 record in Southland Conference play.  They were the No. 6 seed in the 2022 Southland Conference women's basketball tournament losing the head-to-head tie breaker with No. 5 seeded Incarnate Word.  Their season ended with a first round loss in tournament play to No. 7 seed New Orleans 48–57.

Preseason polls

Southland Conference Poll
The Southland Conference released its preseason poll on October 25, 2022. Receiving 61 votes, the Lady Demons were picked to finish eighth in the conference.

Preseason All Conference
Candice Parramore was selected to the Preseason All Conference first team.

Roster

Schedule
Sources:

|-
!colspan=9 style=| Non-conference regular season

|-
!colspan=9 style=| Southland Conference Schedule

|-
!colspan=9 style=| 2023 Jersey Mike's Subs Southland Basketball Tournament
|-

See also
2022–23 Northwestern State Demons basketball team

References

Northwestern State
Northwestern State Lady Demons basketball seasons
Northwestern State
Northwestern State